Niño Josele (born Juan José Heredia, 24 April 1974) is a Spanish guitarist, and exponent of the New flamenco style.

His first two albums show a vibrant, pure, modern flamenco style.

He then released a tribute to Bill Evans' music via his album Paz, showing his versatility as a musician. Having originated in a flamenco background, Josele adapts to complicated jazz music themes as well as creating his own mixture of various genres in his own compositions.

He has participated in the award-winning short film Almendros los Plaza Nueva and "La sombra de las cuerdas" 2009 (By Annabelle Ameline, Benoît Bodlet & Chechu G. Berlanga), a portrait of the guitar genius "El Niño Miguel".

Discography
 Niño Josele (BMG, 2001)
 El Sorbo with Javier Limon (BMG, 2001)
 Paz (Calle 54, 2006)
 Española (DRO, 2009)
 La Venta del Alma (DRO, 2009)
 El Mar De Mi Ventana (DRO, 2012)
 Chano & Josele with Chano Dominguez (Calle 54, 2014)
 Galaxias (Beatclap, 2022)

References

External links
Flamenco World
Flamenco Forum

Spanish flamenco guitarists
Spanish male guitarists
Spanish jazz guitarists
1974 births
Living people
Flamenco guitarists
21st-century guitarists
21st-century male musicians
Male jazz musicians